Terry Irvin (born September 14, 1954) is a former football player in the Canadian Football League (CFL) for ten years. Irvin played defensive back for the Calgary Stampeders, Saskatchewan Roughriders and Montreal Alouettes from 1977-1986. He played college football at Jackson State University.

Irvin snagged 62 career interceptions and is third on the All-Time Interception list in the CFL behind Less Browne (87) and Larry Highbaugh (66). He returned 4 for touchdowns (and one touchdown on a fumble.)

References

1954 births
Living people
People from Columbia, Mississippi
Jackson State Tigers football players
Calgary Stampeders players
Saskatchewan Roughriders players
Montreal Alouettes players
American players of Canadian football
Canadian football defensive backs